Rudbal (also Romanized as Rūdbāl; also known as Rūdbār) is a village in Jaydasht Rural District, in the Central District of Firuzabad County, Fars Province, Iran. At the 2006 census, its population was 1,472, in 361 families.

References 

Populated places in Firuzabad County